Bar Kokhba Revolt coinage were coins issued by the Judaean rebel state, headed by Simon Bar Kokhba, during the Bar Kokhba revolt against the Roman Empire of 132–135 CE.

During the Revolt, large quantities of coins were issued in silver and copper with rebellious inscriptions, all being overstruck over foreign (mostly Roman) coins, when a file was used to remove the designs of the original coins, such as the portrait of the Roman Emperor. The undercoin can clearly be seen on some of the silver coins because they were not filed down so as not to lose the value of the silver. On the bronze coins it is very difficult to see the underlying coin because they were filed down before they were over-struck. In rare instances, the coin cracked when it was overstruck.

The name "Shim'on" (likely referring to the leader of the Revolt, Shim'on (Simon) Bar Koseba) appears on all of the coins of the Bar Kochba Revolt except for a few types issued at the beginning of the Revolt with the name "Eleazar the Priest (Cohen),". The overstruck silver shekel/tetradrachms (see illustration) are among the most religiously significant coins issued by the ancient Jews, because the Holy of Holies of the Jerusalem Temple is shown, with the Ark of the Covenant. The word  "Jerusalem" was inscribed around the representation of the Temple. Beginning in the second year of issue and continuing into the final year, a star appeared above the Temple on many coins, probably in reference to Bar Kochba's nickname "Son of the Star". Agricultural symbols connected with the Jewish harvest festival of Sukkot, such as lulav and etrog, appear on the reverse of some of the smaller bronze coins, surrounded by a Hebrew inscription: 'Year One of the Redemption of Israel', 'Year Two of the Freedom of Israel',  or 'For the Freedom of Jerusalem'.

In May 2020, a coin embossed with grapes and 'Year Two of the Freedom of Israel' was found in the William Davidson Archaeological Park next to the Western Wall in Jerusalem. This was only the fourth coin from this period to be found in the area, and the only Bar Kochba coin to have Jerusalem's name on it.

Alternative attributions
The first group of these coins reviewed by numismatists were 10 silver pieces and one bronze piece found in the mid-nineteenth century. By 1881 the number of coins had grown to 43, and many more have been found since. These coins were first attributed to Bar Kokhba by Moritz Abraham Levy in 1862 and Frederic Madden in 1864.

Since the mid-nineteenth century, a number of scholars have provided alternative attributions for the coins. Claude Reignier Conder, writing in 1909, suggested that the coins were forgeries of the coins of Simon Thassi. Wolf Wirgin, writing in 1959, suggested that the coins were instead minted by King Herod Agrippa Alice Muehsam, writing in 1966, suggested that those coins with dates such as "Year 1" were actually First Jewish Revolt coinage.

See also

 List of historical currencies
 Shekel
 Zuz (Jewish coin)
 Gerah

References

Further reading
 
 
 
 
 
 
 Mildenberg, L. (1980). "Bar Kokhba Coins and Documents." Harvard Studies in Classical Philology, 84, 311–335. doi:10.2307/311055
 
 
 

2nd-century works
Jews and Judaism in the Roman Empire
Ancient currencies
Bar Kokhba revolt
Currencies of Israel
Historical currencies, List of
Coinage
Numismatics
130s establishments in the Roman Empire
130s disestablishments in the Roman Empire